This is a list of irredentist claims or disputes. Irredentism is any political or popular movement that seeks to claim or reclaim and occupy a land that the movement's members consider to be a "lost" (or "unredeemed") territory from their nation's past. Not all territorial disputes are irredentist, although they are often couched in irredentist rhetoric to justify and legitimise such claims both internationally and within the country. What is and is not considered an irredentist claim is sometimes contentious.

Current governmental irredentist claims

Argentina

Argentina has claimed land that used to be part of, or was associated with, the Spanish territory of the Viceroyalty of the Rio de la Plata. The viceroyalty began to dissolve into separate independent states in the early 19th century, one of which later became Argentina. The claims included, amongst other areas, parts of what in 2019 were Chile, Paraguay, Brazil, Uruguay, and Bolivia. Some of these claims have been settled, although others are still active. The active claims include part of the land border with Chile, a section of the Antarctic continent, and the British South Atlantic islands, including the Falklands.

Argentina renews these claims periodically. It considers the Falkland archipelago to be part of the Tierra del Fuego Province, along with South Georgia and the South Sandwich Islands. Its claim is included in the transitional provisions of the Constitution of Argentina as amended in 1994:

Bolivia

The 2009 constitution of Bolivia states that the country has an "unrenounceable right over the territory that gives it access to the Pacific Ocean and its maritime space". In 1873, Bolivia and Peru ceded to Chile after the War of the Pacific, which left Bolivia as a landlocked country. The lost Atacama region is a source of conflict in the two countries' relations. Every year, Bolivians celebrate the Día del Mar (Day of the Sea) in observance of the lost territories.

China (PRC)

The preamble to the Constitution of the People's Republic of China states, "Taiwan is part of the sacred territory of the People's Republic of China (PRC). It is the lofty duty of the entire Chinese people, including our compatriots in Taiwan, to accomplish the great task of reunifying the motherland." The PRC claim to sovereignty over Taiwan is generally based on the theory of the succession of states, with the PRC claiming that it is the successor state to the Republic of China (ROC).

However, the People's Republic of China (PRC) has never controlled Taiwan. The ROC government formerly administered both mainland China and Taiwan but has been administering primarily Taiwan only, since the Chinese Civil War in which it fought the People's Liberation Army of the Chinese Communist Party. While the official name of the state remains the 'Republic of China', the country is commonly called 'Taiwan', as Taiwan makes up 99% of the controlled territory of the ROC.

China (ROC) 

 
The Qing dynasty of China ceded Taiwan and the Penghu Islands to the Empire of Japan in perpetuity in the Treaty of Shimonoseki in 1895, along with the Liaodong Peninsula. The Republic of Formosa was a short-lived republic that then existed on the island of Taiwan for about five months in 1895 in the period between the formal cession of Taiwan to the Empire of Japan and de facto Japanese occupation and control. Japan then established a colony on Taiwan that existed until control of Taiwan was ceded to the Nationalist Government of the Republic of China in 1945.

Article 4 of the Constitution of the Republic of China originally stated that "[t]he territory of the Republic of China within its existing national boundaries shall not be altered except by a resolution of the National Assembly". The National Assembly was de facto abolished in 2005, whose power was inherited by the Legislative Yuan. The Legislative Yuan holds the power to decide a referendum regarding changes to the ROC territory. Throughout the 1950s and 1960s, the Government of the Republic of China on Taiwan actively maintained itself to be the legitimate ruler of the entirety of China, including both mainland China, Taiwan, Tibet and Outer Mongolia. As part of its current policy of maintaining the 'status quo', the ROC has not renounced claims over the territories currently controlled by the PRC, Mongolia, India, Russia, Myanmar, Pakistan, Bhutan, North Korea and some Central Asian states. However, the ROC does not actively pursue these claims in practice; the remaining claims that the ROC is actively seeking are of uninhabited islands: the Senkaku Islands, whose sovereignty is also asserted by Japan and is part of Ishigaki, Okinawa. As far as the Paracel Islands and Spratly Islands in the South China Sea are concerned, the Philippines, Malaysia, Brunei, and Vietnam have repeatedly claimed sovereignty over some or most of these islands, rejecting the Chinese claimed "Nine-dash line".

Comoros
Article 1 of the Constitution of the Union of the Comoros begins: "The Union of the Comoros is a republic, composed of the autonomous islands of Mohéli, Mayotte, Anjouan, and Grande Comore." Mayotte, geographically a part of the Comoro Islands, was the only island of the four to vote against independence from France (independence losing 37%–63%) in the referendum held December 22, 1974. Mayotte is currently a department of the French Republic.

Guatemala

Guatemala has claimed Belize in whole or in part since 1821.

India, Pakistan and China

The region of Kashmir in North India has been the issue of a territorial dispute between India and Pakistan since 1947, the Kashmir conflict. Multiple wars have been fought over the issue, the first one immediately upon independence and Partition in 1947. To stave off a Pakistani and tribal invasion, Maharaja Hari Singh of the princely state of Jammu and Kashmir signed the Instrument of Accession with India.

Kashmir has remained divided in three parts, administered by India, Pakistan, and China, since then. On the basis of the instrument of accession, however, India continues to claim the entire Kashmir region as its integral part. All modern Indian political parties support the return of the entirety of Kashmir to India, and all official maps of India show the entire Kashmir (including parts under Pakistani or Chinese administration after 1947) as an integral part of India.

Israel and Palestine

The nation state of Israel was established in 1948. The United Nations General Assembly passed U.N. Resolution 181, otherwise known as the United Nations Partition Plan for Palestine, with 72% of the valid votes. Eventually, Israeli independence was achieved following the liquidation of the former British-administered Mandate for Palestine, the departure of the British and the Independence War of 1947-1949 between the Jews in ex-Mandatory Palestine and five Arab League states' armies. The Jewish claim to Palestine as a Jewish homeland can be seen as an example of irredentist reclamation of what Zionists consider lost Jewish land. These claims are based on ancestral habitation (and in some periods sovereignty) in the land and the cultural/religious significance of that region as expressed in the Hebrew Bible. The latter is particularly relevant to the Israeli claim to Jerusalem.

Judea and Samaria, as the Bible terms them, formed part of the ancient Kingdom of Israel (designated the West Bank by Jordan in 1947). Israel conquered and occupied the West Bank and the Gaza Strip (previously annexed by Jordan and occupied by Egypt respectively) in the Six-Day War in 1967. Israel withdrew from Gaza in August 2005; the Judea and Samaria Area (the West Bank) remain under Israeli control. Israel has never explicitly claimed sovereignty over any part of the West Bank apart from East Jerusalem, which it unilaterally annexed in 1980. However, the Israel Defense Forces supports and defends hundreds of thousands of Israeli citizens who have migrated to the West Bank, incurring criticism by some who otherwise support Israel. The United Nations Security Council, the United Nations General Assembly, and some countries and international organizations continue to regard Israel as occupying Gaza. (See Israeli-Occupied Territories)

The Israeli annexing instrument, the Jerusalem Law—one of the Basic Laws of Israel (Israel does not have a constitution)—declares Jerusalem, "complete and united", to be the capital of Israel. Article 3 of the Basic Law of the Palestinian Authority, which the Palestinian National Authority ratified in 2002 and which serves as an interim Palestinian constitution, claims that "Jerusalem is the capital of Palestine". De facto, the Palestinian government administers from Ramallah those parts of the West Bank that Israel has granted it authority over, while the Hamas Movement administers the Gaza Strip from Gaza.

The United States did not recognize Israeli sovereignty over Jerusalem until 2017. In Jerusalem, the United States maintained two Consulates General as a diplomatic representation to the city of Jerusalem alone, separate from representation to the state of Israel. One of the Consulates General was established before the 1967 war, and the other in a recently-constructed building on the Israeli side of Jerusalem. Moreover, the US Congress passed the Jerusalem Embassy Act in 1995 that says that the US shall move its embassy from Tel Aviv to Jerusalem, but allows the president to delay the move every year if it is deemed contrary to national security interests. From 1995 to 2017, every president delayed the move. However, President Donald Trump in December 2017 declared his intention to move the embassy to Jerusalem and in May 2018, the embassy officially did so.

Japan

Japan claims the four southernmost islands of the Russian-administered Kuril Islands, the island chain north of Hokkaido, annexed by the Soviet Union following World War II with the treaty of San Francisco. Japan also claims the South Korean-administered Liancourt Rocks, which are known as Dokdo in Korea and as Takeshima in Japan and have been claimed since the end of the Second World War.

Philippines

The Philippines claim portions of North Borneo as part of its territory, which is administered as part of Malaysia's Sabah state. The Philippines' irredentist claim is based on the disputed territory being formerly administered by the Sultanate of Sulu.

Russia

Russia promotes a claim on the territory of Ukraine, a place which Russian President Vladimir Putin describes as "essentially the same historical and spiritual space." This claim has also been explicitly described as "irredentist" by American commentators.

Russia also promotes claims to various post-Soviet states and militarily supports several breakaway polities in eastern Ukraine, eastern Moldova and northern Georgia.

 Ukraine (see All-Russian nation and 2022 Russian invasion of Ukraine)
 Crimea (see Annexation of Crimea by the Russian Federation, Autonomous Republic of Crimea, 2003 Tuzla Island conflict)
 Donbas (see 2022 Russian invasion of Ukraine)
 Donetsk People's Republic (see 2022 Russian invasion of Ukraine, International recognition of the Donetsk People's Republic and the Luhansk People's Republic) illegally annexed by Russia in October 2022
 Luhansk People's Republic (see 2022 Russian invasion of Ukraine, International recognition of the Donetsk People's Republic and the Luhansk People's Republic) illegally annexed by Russia in October 2022
 Belarus (see All-Russian nation)
 Moldova
 Transnistria/Administrative-Territorial Units of the Left Bank of the Dniester (see Proposed Russian annexation of Transnistria)
 Georgia
 Abkhazia
 South Ossetia (see Proposed Russian annexation of South Ossetia)

Spain

Spain maintains a claim on Gibraltar, a British Overseas Territory near the southernmost tip of the Iberian Peninsula, which has been British since the 18th Century.

Gibraltar was captured in 1704, during the War of the Spanish Succession (1701–1714). The Kingdom of Spain formally ceded the territory in perpetuity to the British Crown in 1713, under Article X of the Treaty of Utrecht. Spain's territorial claim was formally reasserted by the Spanish dictator Francisco Franco in the 1960s and has been continued by successive Spanish governments. In 2002 an agreement in principle on joint sovereignty over Gibraltar between the governments of the United Kingdom and Spain was decisively rejected in a referendum. The British Government now refuses to discuss sovereignty without the consent of the Gibraltarians.

Sri Lanka 

The North-East of the island has been a mainly Tamil-speaking region since the 13th century AD with many Hindu temples existing for centuries on sites in close proximity to ancient Buddhist ruins, which archaeologists associate with the ancient Sinhalese. Sinhala Buddhist nationalists in Sri Lanka believe that these ancient Buddhist ruins should be reinstated and that the later Hindu temples should be removed or destroyed, despite being in use for centuries. In 2020 the Sri Lankan government set up an Archaeological Taskforce with the powers to implement this project in the Eastern Province. Land belonging to Tamils in the North-East has been confiscated by the Sri Lankan government and given to recent Sinhalese settlers from the south, who believe that they are reclaiming land that only belongs to the Sinhalese.

Venezuela 

The Guayana Esequiba is a territory administered by Guyana but claimed by Venezuela. It was first included in the Viceroyalty of New Granada and the Captaincy General of Venezuela by Spain, but was later included in Essequibo by the Dutch and in British Guiana by the United Kingdom. Originally, parts of what is now eastern Venezuela were included in the disputed area. The status of the territory is subject to the Treaty of Geneva, which was signed by the United Kingdom, Venezuela and British Guiana governments on February 17, 1966. This treaty stipulates that the parties will agree to find a practical, peaceful and satisfactory solution to the dispute.

Major non-governmental irredentist claims

Albania 

Greater Albania or Ethnic Albania as called by the Albanian nationalists themselves, is an irredentist concept of lands outside the borders of Albania which are considered part of a greater national homeland by most Albanians, based on claims on the present-day or historical presence of Albanian populations in those areas. The term incorporates claims to all of Kosovo, as well as territories in the neighbouring countries Montenegro, Greece, Serbia and North Macedonia. According to the Gallup Balkan Monitor 2010 report, the idea of a Greater Albania was supported by the majority of Albanians in Albania (63%), Kosovo (81%) and North Macedonia (53%).

In 2012, as part of the celebrations for the 100th Anniversary of the Independence of Albania, Prime Minister Sali Berisha spoke of "Albanian lands" stretching from Preveza in Greece to Preševo in Serbia, and from the Macedonian capital of Skopje to the Montenegrin capital of Podgorica, angering Albania's neighbours. The comments were also inscribed on a parchment that will be displayed at a museum in the city of Vlore, where the country's independence from the Ottoman Empire was declared in 1912.

Armenia 

The concept of a United Armenia (classical , reformed: Միացյալ Հայաստան, translit. Miatsyal Hayastan) refers to areas within the traditional Armenian homeland—the Armenian Highland—which are currently or have historically been mostly populated by Armenians. This incorporates claims to Western Armenia (eastern Turkey), Nagorno-Karabakh (Artsakh), the landlocked exclave Nakhchivan of Azerbaijan and the Javakheti (Javakhk) region of Georgia. Nagorno-Karabakh and Javakhk are overwhelmingly inhabited by Armenians. Western Armenia and Nakhchivan had significant Armenian populations in the early 20th century, but no longer do. The Armenian population of eastern Turkey was almost completely exterminated during the genocide of 1915, when the millennia-long Armenian presence in the area largely ended and Armenian cultural heritage was largely destroyed by the Turkish government. The territorial claims to Turkey are often seen as the ultimate goal of the recognition of the Armenian genocide and the hypothetical reparations of the genocide.

Ireland 

The Irish Free State achieved partial independence with a dominion status under the British Empire in 1922. This state did not include Northern Ireland, which comprised six counties in the north-east of the island of Ireland which remained in the United Kingdom. When the Constitution of Ireland was adopted in 1937 it provided that the name of the state is Ireland; this is considered the time that the Republic of Ireland became a full-fledged independent nation. In the constitution Articles 2 and 3 provided that "[t]he national territory consists of the whole island of Ireland", while stipulating that "[p]ending the re-integration of the national territory", the powers of the state were restricted to legislate only for the area which had formed part of the Irish Free State. Arising from the Northern Ireland peace process, the matter was mutually resolved as part of the Good Friday Agreement in 1998. Ireland's constitution was altered by referendum and its territorial claim to Northern Ireland was removed.

The amended constitution asserts that while it is the entitlement of "every person born in the island of Ireland … to be part of the Irish Nation" and to hold Irish citizenship, "a united Ireland shall be brought about only by peaceful means with the consent of a majority of the people, democratically expressed, in both jurisdictions in the island". A North/South Ministerial Council was created between the two jurisdictions and given executive authority. The advisory and consultative role of the government of Ireland in the government of Northern Ireland granted by the United Kingdom, that had begun with the 1985 Anglo-Irish Agreement, was maintained, although that Agreement itself was ended. The two states also settled the long-running dispute concerning their respective names: Ireland and the United Kingdom of Great Britain and Northern Ireland, with both governments agreeing to use those names.

Under the Irish republican theory of legitimism, the Irish Republic declared in 1916 was in existence from then on, denying the legitimacy of either the state of Ireland or the position of Northern Ireland within the United Kingdom. Through much of its history, this was the position of Sinn Féin; however, it effectively abandoned this stance after accepting the Good Friday Agreement. Small groups which split from Sinn Féin continue to adopt this stance, including Republican Sinn Féin, linked with the Continuity IRA, and the 32 County Sovereignty Movement, linked with the Real IRA.

Historical irredentist claims

Africa 
Irredentism is commonplace in Africa due to the political boundaries of former European colonial nation-states passing through ethnic boundaries, and recent declarations of independence after civil war. For example, some Ethiopian nationalist circles still claim the former Ethiopian province of Eritrea (internationally recognized as the independent State of Eritrea in 1993 after a 30-year civil war).

Horn of Africa

Greater Somalia refers to the region in the Horn of Africa in which ethnic Somalis are and have historically represented the predominant population. The territory encompasses Somalia, Somaliland, the Somali region in Ethiopia, the North Eastern Province in Kenya and southern and eastern Djibouti. Ogaden in eastern Ethiopia has seen military and civic movements seeking to make it part of Somalia. This culminated in the 1977–78 Ogaden War between the two neighbours where the Somali military offensive between July 1977 and March 1978 over the disputed Ethiopian region Ogaden ended when the Somali Armed Forces retreated back across the border and a truce was declared. The Kenyan Northern Frontier District also saw conflict during the Shifta War (1963–1967) when a secessionist conflict in which ethnic Somalis in the Lamu, Garissa, Wajir and Mandera counties (all except Lamu formed part of the former North Eastern Province, abolished in 2013), attempted to join with their fellow Somalis in a "Greater Somalia". There has been no similar conflicts in Djibouti, which was previously known as the "French Somaliland" during colonisation. Here the apparent struggles for unification manifested itself in political strife that ended when in a referendum to join France as opposed to the Somali Republic succeeded among rumours of widespread vote rigging. and the subsequent death of Somali nationalist Mahmoud Harbi, Vice President of the Government Council, who was killed in a plane crash two years later under suspicious circumstances. Some sources say that Somalia has also laid a claim to the Socotra archipelago, which is currently recognized by the international community as part of Yemen, but occupied by the United Arab Emirates

North Africa

In North Africa, the prime examples of irredentism are the concepts of Greater Morocco and Greater Mauritania. While Mauritania has since relinquished any claims to territories outside its internationally recognized borders, Morocco continues to claim Western Sahara, which it refers to as its "Southern Provinces".

Southern Africa
Greater Eswatini includes much of the Mpumalanga Province of South Africa. King Mswati III of Eswatini set up the Border Restoration Committee in 2013 to negotiate restoration of the original borders.

Asia

Assyria

The Assyrian homeland is a geographic and cultural region situated in Northern Mesopotamia that has been traditionally inhabited by Assyrian people. The area with the greatest concentration of Assyrians on earth is located in the Assyrian homeland, or the Assyrian Triangle, a region which comprises the Nineveh Plains, southern Hakkari and the Barwari regions. This is where some Assyrian groups seek to create an independent nation state. The land roughly mirrors the boundaries of ancient Assyria proper, and the later Achaemenid, Seleucid, Parthian, Roman and Sassanid provinces of Assyria (Athura/Assuristan) that was extant between the 25th century BC and 7th century AD.

Azerbaijan

Whole Azerbaijan is an irredentist concept of uniting presumed historically Azerbaijani-inhabited territories into Republic of Azerbaijan.  Western Azerbaijan is an irredentist political concept that is used in Azerbaijan mostly to refer to Armenia. Azerbaijani statements claim that the territory of the modern Armenian republic were lands that once belonged to Azerbaijanis.

Bangladesh

Greater Bangladesh is an assumption of several Indian intellectuals that the neighbouring country of Bangladesh has an aspiration to unite all Bengali dominated regions under their flag. These include the states of West Bengal, Tripura and Assam as well as the Andaman Islands which are currently part of India and the Burmese State of Rakhine. The theory is principally based on a widespread belief amongst Indian masses that a large number of illegal Bangladeshi immigrants reside in Indian territory. It is alleged that illegal immigration to India is actively encouraged by some political groups in Bangladesh as well as the Government of Bangladesh to convert large parts of India's northeastern states and West Bengal into Muslim-majority areas that would subsequently seek to separate from India and join Muslim-majority Bangladesh.

Caucasus

Irredentism is acute in the Caucasus region. The Nagorno-Karabakh movement's original slogan of miatsum ('union') was explicitly oriented towards re-unification with Armenia as to the pre-Soviet status, feeding an Azerbaijani understanding of the conflict as a bilateral one between itself and an irredentist Armenia. According to Prof. Thomas Ambrosio, "Armenia's successful irredentist project in the Nagorno-Karabakh region of Azerbaijan" and "From 1992 to the cease-fire in 1994, Armenia encountered a highly permissive or tolerant international environment that allowed its annexation of some 15 percent of Azerbaijani territory".

In the view of Nadia Milanova, Nagorno-Karabakh represents a combination of separatism and irredentism. However, the area has historically been Armenian, known as the Kingdom of Artsakh or Khachen. In July 1920, the 11th Soviet Red Army invaded and occupied the region and on July 28, the decision to make Nakhchivan a part of modern-day Azerbaijan was cemented on March 16, 1921, in the Treaty of Moscow between Soviet Russia and the newly founded Republic of Turkey.
Azerbaijan's irredentism, on the other hand, is quite explicit in official statements of the Azerbaijani officials by claiming the UN member-state Armenia as Azerbaijani territory despite the absence of historical evidence of Azerbaijan existing as a separate state up until 1918. On his official meeting in Gyanja on January 21, 2014, President Ilham Aliyev said, "The present-day Armenia is actually located on historical lands of Azerbaijan. Therefore, we will return to all our historical lands in the future. This should be known to young people and children. We must live, we live and we will continue to live with this idea."

China

When Hong Kong and Macau were British and Portuguese territories, respectively, China considered these two territories to be Chinese territories under British and Portuguese administration. Therefore, Hong Kong people and Macau people descended from Chinese immigrants were entitled to Hong Kong Special Administrative Region passport or Macao Special Administrative Region passport after the two territories became special administrative regions. Similar claims are made by China on Arunachal Pradesh and Ladakh as part of Tibet, Mongolia, South China Sea, etc.

India

The call for creation of Akhanda Bharata or Akhand Hindustan has on occasion been raised by some Indian right wing Hindutvadi cultural and political organisations, such as the Hindu Mahasabha, Rashtriya Swayamsevak Sangh (RSS), Vishwa Hindu Parishad, Bharatiya Janata Party (BJP). The name of one organisation sharing this goal, the Akhand Hindustan Morcha, bears the term in its name. Other major Indian non-sectarian political parties, such as the Indian National Congress, maintain a position against the partition of India .

There has been many armed irredentist movements in the region active for almost a century. Most prominent amongst them are the Naga fight for Greater Nagaland, the Chin struggle for a unified Chinland, the Sri Lankan Tamil struggle for a return of their state under Tamil Eelam and other self-determinist movements by the ethnic indigenous peoples of the erstwhile Assam both under the British and post-British Assam under India. Other such movements include Beḻagāva border dispute on Maharashtra and Karnataka border with intentions to unite all Marathi speaking people under one state since the formation of the Karnataka state and dissolution of the bilingual Bombay state.

Indonesia

Indonesia claimed all territories of the former Dutch East Indies, and previously viewed British plans to group the British Malaya and Borneo into a new independent federation of Malaysia as a threat to its objective to create a united state called Greater Indonesia. The Indonesian opposition of Malaysian formation has led to the Indonesia–Malaysia confrontation in the early 1960s. It also held Portuguese Timor (modern East Timor) from 1975 to 2002 based on irredentist claims.

The idea of uniting former British and Dutch colonial possessions in Southeast Asia actually has its roots in the early 20th century, as the concept of Greater Malay (Melayu Raya) was coined in British Malaya espoused by students and graduates of Sultan Idris Training College for Malay Teachers in the late 1920s. Some political figures in Indonesia including Mohammad Yamin and Sukarno revived the idea in the 1950s and named the political union concept as Greater Indonesia.

Iran

Pan-Iranism is an ideology that advocates solidarity and reunification of Iranian peoples living in the Iranian plateau and other regions that have significant Iranian cultural influence, including the Persians, Azerbaijanis, Ossetians, Kurds, Zazas, Tajiks of Tajikistan and Afghanistan, the Pashtuns and the Baloch of Pakistan. The first theoretician was Dr Mahmoud Afshar Yazdi.

The ideology of pan-Iranism is most often used in conjunction with the idea of forming a Greater Iran, which refers to the regions of the Caucasus, West Asia, Central Asia, and parts of South Asia that have significant Iranian cultural influence due to having been either long historically ruled by the various Iranian (Persian) empires (such as those of the Medes, Achaemenids, Parthians, Sassanians, Samanids, Timurids, Safavids, and Afsharids and the Qajar Empire), having considerable aspects of Persian culture in their own culture due to extensive contact with the various Empires based in Persia (e.g., those regions and peoples in the North Caucasus that were not under direct Iranian rule), or are simply nowadays still inhabited by a significant amount of Iranic-speaking people who patronize their respective cultures (as it goes for the western parts of South Asia, Bahrain and China). It roughly corresponds to the territory on the Iranian plateau and its bordering plains. It is also referred to as Greater Persia, while the Encyclopædia Iranica uses the term Iranian Cultural Continent.

Iraq

After gaining independence in 1932, the Kingdom of Iraq immediately declared that the Sheikhdom of Kuwait was rightfully a territory of Iraq, claiming it had been part of an Iraqi territory until being created by the British.

The Iraqi Republic under Abd al-Karim Qasim held an irredentist claim to Khuzestan. It also held irredentist claims to Kuwait.

Saddam Hussein's government sought to annex several territories. In the Iran–Iraq War, Ba'athist Iraq claimed it had the right to hold sovereignty to the east bank of the Shatt al-Arab river held by Iran. Iraq had officially agreed to a compromise to hold the border at the centre-line of the river in the 1975 Algiers Agreement in return for Pahlavi Iran to end its support for Kurdish rebels in Iraq. The overthrow of Mohammad Reza Pahlavi and the rise of Ruhollah Khomeini to power in the 1979 Iranian Revolution deteriorated Iran–Iraq relations and following ethnic clashes within Khuzestan and border clashes between Iranian and Iraqi forces, Iraq regarded the Algiers Agreement as nullified and abrogated it and a few days later the Iraqi Armed Forces launched a full-scale invasion of Iran that resulted in the Iran-Iraq War. In addition, Saddam supported the Iraq-based Ahwaz Liberation Movement and their goal of breaking their claimed territory of Ahwaz away from Iran, in the belief that the movement would rouse Khuzestan's Arabs to support the Iraqi invasion. In the Gulf War, Iraq occupied and annexed Kuwait before being expelled by an international military coalition that supported the restoration of Kuwait's sovereignty.

After annexing Kuwait, Iraqi forces amassed on the border with Saudi Arabia, with foreign intelligence services suspected that Saddam was preparing for an invasion of Saudi Arabia to capture or attack its oil fields that were a very short distance from the border. It has been suspected that Saddam Hussein intended to invade and annex a portion of Saudi Arabia's Eastern Province on the justification that the Saudi region of Al-Hasa had been part of the Ottoman province of Basra that the British had helped Saudi Arabia conquer in 1913. It is believed that Saddam intended to annex Kuwait and the Al-Hasa oil region, so that Iraq would be in control of the Persian Gulf region's vast oil production, that would make Iraq the dominant power in the Middle East. The Saudi Arabian government was alarmed by Iraq's mobilization of ten heavily armed and well-supplied Iraqi Army divisions along the border of Iraqi-annexed Kuwait and Saudi Arabia, and warned the United States government that they believed that Iraq was preparing for an immediate invasion of Saudi Arabia's Eastern Province. The Saudi Arabian government stated that without assistance from outside forces, Iraq could invade and seize control of the entire Eastern Province within six hours.

Israel 

Greater Israel is an expression that has held several different biblical and political meanings over time. It is often used, in an irredentist fashion, to refer to the historic or desired borders of Israel. Currently, the most common definition of the land encompassed by the term is the territory of the State of Israel together with the Palestinian territories. An earlier definition, favored by Revisionist Zionism, included the territory of the former Emirate of Transjordan.

Korea

The 1909 Gando Convention addressed a territory dispute between Qing China and Joseon Korea in China's favor. Because the convention was made by the occupying Empire of Japan, it was de jure nullified after the Surrender of Japan and North Korea started to control the area south of Paektu Mountain.

In 1961, the People's Republic of China published a map nominally claiming a boundary passing dozens of kilometers south of Paekdu Mountain. North Korea protested this by publishing a national map with claims on Gando. While neither of these claims was seriously enforced, the area between the Gando Convention line and Paektu Mountain were still in dispute. In 1963, North Korea signed a boundary treaty with the People's Republic of China, which settled the boundary between the two at the Yalu/Amnok (Chinese/Korean names) and Tumen Rivers; this agreement primarily stipulated that three-fifths of Heaven Lake at the peak of Mt. Baekdu would go to North Korea, and two-fifths to China.

In 1990, the Soviet Union and North Korea signed a border treaty recognizing Noktundo island, an island of historical significance in Joseon military history involving Admiral Yi Sun-sin, as a part of the Soviet Union and later Russia. South Korea does not recognize the treaty and maintains the nation's claim on the island administered by Russia.

While South Korea did not recognize this agreement, they made no serious attempts to gain Korean sovereignty on Gando. South Korea did not officially renounce their claim on Gando, but the Sino-Korean boundary on South Korean national map loosely follows the 1961 line except Mt. Baekdu, accepting the boundary on the map as the de facto boundary.

Some Koreans who maintain an irredentist claim on Gando regard Gando as Korean territory and the 1963 treaty as null and void. More ambitious claims include all parts of Manchuria that the Goguryeo kingdom controlled.

Lebanon

The Lebanese nationalism incorporates irredentist views seeking to unify all the lands of ancient Phoenicia around present day Lebanon. This comes from the fact that present day Lebanon, the Mediterranean coast of Syria, and northern Israel is the area that roughly corresponds to ancient Phoenicia and as a result the majority of the Lebanese people identify with the ancient Phoenician population of that region. The proposed Greater Lebanese country includes Lebanon, Mediterranean coast of Syria, and Northern Israel.

Mongolia

The irredentist idea that advocates cultural and political solidarity of Mongols. The proposed territory usually includes the independent state of Mongolia, the Chinese regions of Inner Mongolia (Southern Mongolia) and Dzungaria (in Xinjiang), and the Russian subjects of Buryatia. Sometimes Tuva and the Altai Republic are included as well.

Nepal

Greater Nepal involves the incorporation of the territories won by the Kingdom of Nepal at its greatest extent back to the Federal Democratic Republic of Nepal.

Pakistan

Pakistani irredentism involves the incorporations of Muslim majority lands of British India under Pakistan. This is most notable in the conflict in the Jammu and Kashmir state, a Muslim majority state divided between Pakistan and India.

Syria

The Syrian Social Nationalist Party, which operates in Lebanon and Syria, works for the unification of most modern states of the Levant and beyond in a single state referred to as Greater Syria. The proposed Syrian country includes Lebanon, Israel, Syria, Jordan, and parts of Turkey, and has at times been expanded to include Iraq, Cyprus, and the Sinai peninsula.

Turkey

Misak-ı Millî is the set of six important decisions made by the last term of the Ottoman Parliament. Parliament met on 28 January 1920 and published their decisions on 12 February 1920. These decisions worried the occupying Allies, resulting in the de jure Occupation of Constantinople by the British, French and Italian troops on 16 March 1920 and the establishment of a new Turkish nationalist parliament, the Grand National Assembly, in Ankara.

The Ottoman Minister of Internal Affairs, Damat Ferid Pasha, made the opening speech of parliament due to Mehmed VI's illness. A group of parliamentarians called Felâh-ı Vatan was established by Mustafa Kemal's friends to acknowledge the decisions taken at the Erzurum Congress and the Sivas Congress. Mustafa Kemal said "It is the nation's iron fist that writes the Nation's Oath which is the main principle of our independence to the annals of history." Decisions taken by this parliament were used as the basis for the new Turkish Republic's claims in the Treaty of Lausanne.

United Arab Emirates

The Greater and Lesser Tunbs as well as Abu Musa are disputed by the United Arab Emirates with Iran.

Yemen

Greater Yemen is a theory giving Yemen claim to former territories that were held by various predecessor states that existed between the Himyarite period and 18th century. The areas claimed include parts of modern Saudi Arabia and Oman.

Europe

Bulgaria

Based on territorial definitions according Bulgarian ethnicity, also the territories of the historical Bulgarian national state – the Bulgarian Empire, a Greater Bulgaria nationalist movement has been active for more than a century, aiming to annex the rest of the three national core regions – Moesia, Thrace and Macedonia.

Croatia

Finland

Former Yugoslavia

Some of the most violent irredentist conflicts of recent times in Europe flared up as a consequence of the break-up of the former federal state of Yugoslavia in the early 1990s. One of the last conflicts erupted further south with the ethnic Albanian majority in Kosovo seeking to switch allegiance to the adjoining state of Albania.

France

Germany

During the debate of what was then called the German Question (die deutsche Frage) in the 19th century prior to the unification of Germany (1871), the term Großdeutschland, "Greater Germany", referred to a possible German nation consisting of the states that later comprised the German Empire and Austria. The term Kleindeutschland "Lesser Germany" referred to a possible German state without Austria. The term was later used by Germans referring to Greater Germany, a state consisting of pre–World War I Germany, Austria and the Sudetenland.

Since the foundation of the German Reich in 1871, the only times during which German governments did not make some form of explicit or implicit irredentist demand or claim - including the demand for reunification during German partition - were prior to World War I and following German reunification.

The Weimar Republic contained significant irredentist elements which frequently formed part of the governing coalitions. The Treaty of Locarno settled Germany's western boundaries (accepting among others the definitive loss of Alsace-Lorraine) but regarding the eastern boundaries with Czechoslovakia and the Second Polish Republic it only contained a provision that any revision of borders would occur non-violently. There was never a renunciation on the part of the German government prior to World War II of any claim to territory to the east of its internationally recognized borders. The foreign ministers of Germany and France who are credited with the success of the treaty negotiations, Aristide Briand and Gustav Stresemann, were awarded the Nobel Peace Prize for their efforts. The Territory of the Saar Basin was put under a League of Nations mandate but was de facto a French protectorate. In 1935 (two years after Hitler had been appointed chancellor) a previously agreed to referendum was held, transferring sovereignty over the Saar Area to Germany. The reference to "1937 borders" (:de:Deutsches Reich in den Grenzen vom 31. Dezember 1937) was used after the war to allow for the inclusion of the Saar Area into this concept of "Germany" while at the same time excluding the territorial developments of 1938 and early 1939 (see below), which were widely seen as the illegitimate result of German aggression and Anglo-French appeasement after the war.

A main point of Nazi ideology was to reunify all Germans either born or living outside of Germany to create an "all-German Reich". These beliefs ultimately resulted in the Munich Agreement, which ceded to Germany areas of Czechoslovakia that were mainly inhabited by Sudeten Germans, and the Anschluss, which ceded the entire country of Austria to Germany; both events occurred in 1938. Later (but still prior to the outbreak of general war in Europe) the Protectorate of Bohemia and Moravia was formed which included a Czech ethnic majority and a German speaking minority among other ethnic groups. Among the Origins of World War II in Europe was the German irredentist demand to the Polish corridor an ethnically diverse but predominantly Polish area that separated East Prussia from the rest of Germany and was the only access to the sea for the Second Polish Republic. Another point of contention in the interwar German-Polish relationship was the status of the Free City of Danzig which had an ethnic German majority population but had become a League of Nations backed City State following World War I due to its strategic importance.

During German partition both states initially claimed their intention was an eventual German reunification, but East Germany eventually abandoned this claim. The German Basic Law contained both an exhortation towards reunification and a provision (Article 23) concerning the "joining of other German areas" to the area of validity of the Basic Law. Article 23 was struck from the Basic Law in the course of reunification and has since been replaced with an unrelated provision concerning the European Union. The German Democratic Republic was relatively quick to officially endorse the Oder Neisse line as its new eastern border, signing the Treaty of Zgorzelec in 1950. However, there remained irredentist sentiment regarding territory east of the new border among the populous of both German states. Most of the West German public and political class refused to accept the loss of the eastern territories in the early years of the postwar era as evidenced by a list of potential car license plates for cities in the GDR, in areas lost due to World War II and even in areas like the former Free City of  Danzig. The government of Willy Brandt (governed 1969-1974) made efforts to de facto recognize the postwar status quo in exchange for political rapprochement in the course of Ostpolitik, accepting among other things the entry of both East and West Germany into the United Nations in 1973. Willy Brandt was awarded a Nobel Peace Prize for his reconciliation efforts. However, the slim majority his social-liberal coalition had won in the 1969 German federal election had dwindled by 1972 because several members of the Social Democratic Party and the Free Democratic Party had switched parties due to their disagreement with Ostpolitik. After surprisingly surviving the 1972 constructive vote of no confidence, the government was reelected in a landslide in the 1972 German federal election which was held a year early in light of events. While the CDU/CSU government of Helmut Kohl which came into office in 1982 did not reverse Ostpolitik, the treaties accepting the postwar borders had been carefully worded so as to preserve the option of some different "final settlement" in the course of a peace treaty or following a possible German reunification. Thus the question of German claims to territory outside the two German states became acute again in the course of the negotiations that ultimately led to the Treaty on the Final Settlement with Respect to Germany or "two plus four agreement" and the final official renunciation of all German claims to any territory beyond the borders it achieved on October 3, 1990. Since then irredentist claims have been limited to a tiny far right minority and have had no major influence on national politics. However, in the course of the Kaliningrad question there were negotiations between Germany and Russia as to whether sovereignty should be transferred to Germany.

Greece

Following the Greek War of Independence in 1821–1832, Greece began to contest areas inhabited by Greeks, primarily against the Ottoman Empire. The Megali Idea (Great Idea) envisioned Greek incorporation of Greek-inhabited lands, but also historical lands in Asia Minor corresponding with the predominantly Greek and Orthodox Byzantine Empire and the dominions of the ancient Greeks.

The Greek quest began with the acquisition of Thessaly through the Convention of Constantinople in 1881, a failed war against Turkey in 1897 and the Balkan Wars (Macedonia, Epirus, some Aegean Islands). After World War I, Greece acquired Western Thrace from Bulgaria as per the Treaty of Neuilly-sur-Seine, but also Ionia/Smyrna and Eastern Thrace (excluding Constantinople) from the Ottoman Empire as ordained in the Treaty of Sèvres. Subsequently, Greece launched an unsuccessful campaign to further their gains in Asia Minor, but were halted by the Turkish War of Independence. The events culminated into the Great Fire of Smyrna, Population exchange between Greece and Turkey, and Treaty of Lausanne which returned Eastern Thrace and Ionia to the newfound Republic of Turkey. The events are known as the "Asia Minor Catastrophe" to Greeks. The Ionian Islands were ceded by Britain in 1864, and the Dodecanese by Italy in 1947.

Another concern of the Greeks is the incorporation of Cyprus which was ceded by the Ottomans to the British. As a result of the Cyprus Emergency the island gained independence as the Republic of Cyprus in 1960. The failed incorporation by Greece through coup d'état and the Turkish invasion of Cyprus in 1974 led to the formation of the mostly unrecognized Northern Cyprus and has culminated into the present-day Cyprus issue.

Hungary

The restoration of the borders of Hungary to their state prior to World War I, in order to unite all ethnic Hungarians within the same country once again.

Hungarian irredentism or Greater Hungary are irredentist and revisionist political ideas concerning redemption of territories of the historical Kingdom of Hungary. The idea is associated with Hungarian revisionism, targeting at least to regain control over Hungarian-populated areas in Hungary's neighbouring countries. Hungarian historians did not use the term Greater Hungary, because the "Historic Hungary" is the established term for the Kingdom of Hungary before 1920.

The Treaty of Trianon defined the borders of the new independent Hungary and, compared against the claims of the pre-war Kingdom, new Hungary had approximately 72% less land stake and about two-thirds fewer inhabitants, almost 5 million of these being of Hungarian ethnicity. However, only 54% of the inhabitants of the pre-war Kingdom of Hungary were Hungarians before World War I. Following the treaty's instatement, Hungarian leaders became inclined towards revoking some of its terms. This political aim gained greater attention and was a serious national concern up through the second World War. Irredentism in the 1930s led Hungary to form an alliance with Nazi Germany. Eva S. Balogh states: "Hungary's participation in World War II resulted from a desire to revise the Treaty of Trianon so as to recover territories lost after World War I. This revisionism was the basis for Hungary's interwar foreign policy."

Between November 1938 and April 1941, Hungary took full advantage of German patronage and, in four different stages, approximately doubled her size. Ethnically, these acquisitions were a mixed bag, some were populated mostly by Hungarians, while others, such as the remainder of Carpathian Ruthenia, were almost wholly non-Hungarian in composition. However, regarding partitioned Transylvania, the population was mixed, near equal between Hungarians and non-Hungarians.
 
Hungary began with the First Vienna Award in 1938 (redeeming southern Slovakia from Czechoslovakia with mainly Hungarians) and the Second Vienna Award in 1940 (Northern Transylvania). Through military campaigns it gained the remainder of Carpathian Ruthenia in 1939. In 1941 it added the Yugoslav parts of Bačka, Baranja, Međimurje, and Prekmurje.

After defeat in 1945, the borders of Hungary as defined by the Treaty of Trianon were restored, except for three Hungarian villages that were transferred to Czechoslovakia. These villages are today administratively a part of Bratislava.

Italy

Italy's territorial claims were on the basis of re-establishing a Romanesque Empire, a fourth shore according to the concept of Mare Nostrum (Latin for 'Our Sea') and traditional ethnic borders. Evident in Italy's rapid takeover of surrounding territories under Fascist leader Benito Mussolini and claims following the collapsed 1915 Treaty of London and 1919 Treaty of Versailles which established feelings of betrayal. Mussolini and Hitler's similarities including a joint hatred towards the French and wanting to expand their territories brought the two leaders together, solidified in the Pact of Steel and later WW2. By 1942 Italy had conquered Abyssinia (modern day Ethiopia and Eritrea), Libya, much of the north coast of Egypt, and what is now Somalia. On the European continent, and with significant German assistance, it occupied Istria, Dalmatia, Albania, Slovenia, Croatia, Macedonia, and France's Corsica; Malta was also bombed. Underlying tensions remained with France, over its territories of Corsica, Nice and Savoy.

Lithuania

Ethnographic Lithuania is a nationalist concept that defines Lithuanian territories as a significant part of the territories that belonged to the Grand Duchy of Lithuania and Lithuanians as all people living on them, regardless of whether those people contemporarily or currently speak the Lithuanian language and considered themselves Lithuanian. According to the supporters of the ethnographic Lithuania, Lithuanian Poles and Northwestern Belarusians were "slavicized Lithuanians" who needed to be re-Lithuanized. They argued that an individual cannot decide on his ethnicity and nationality, which are decided not by language but ancestry.

North Macedonia

Some Macedonian nationalists promoted the irredentist concept of a United Macedonia among ethnic Macedonian nationalists, which involves territorial claims on the northern province of Macedonia in Greece, but also in Blagoevgrad Province ("Pirin Macedonia") in Bulgaria, Albania, and Serbia. The United Macedonia concept aims to unify the transnational region of Macedonia in the Balkans (which they claim as their homeland and which they assert was wrongfully divided under the Treaty of Bucharest in 1913), into a single state under their domination, with Thessaloniki (Solun in the Slavic languages) as its capital.

Norway
The Kingdom of Norway had several territorial disputes throughout its history, mainly regarding islands and sea boundaries in the Arctic Ocean. The Old Kingdom of Norway, which was the Norwegian territories at its maximum extent, included Iceland, the settleable areas of Greenland, the Faroe Islands, and the Northern Isles and Hebrides (today part of Scotland). Under Danish sovereignty since they established a hegemonic position in the Kalmar Union, the territories were considered as Norwegian colonies. When in the Treaty of Kiel in 1814, Norway's territories were transferred from Denmark to Sweden, the territories of Iceland, Greenland, and the Faroe Islands were maintained by Denmark.

In 1919, the foreign minister of Norway, Nils Claus Ihlen, declared that the Norwegians would not object to a claim of Denmark to the whole island of Greenland, which at the time was mostly occupied by Danish colonies, with a few Norwegian settlements in the eastern part of the island. The claim was formally declared in 1921, but the Norwegian government rejected Denmark's claim and later stated that parts of eastern Greenland belonged to Norway. A dispute between the two countries was not settled until 1933, by the Permanent Court of International Justice. The court concluded that Denmark had sovereignty of the whole island of Greenland, ending Norwegian control over Erik the Red's Land. Norway formerly included the provinces Jämtland, Härjedalen, Idre-Särna (lost since the Second Treaty of Brömsebro), and Bohuslän (lost since the Treaty of Roskilde), which were ceded to Sweden after Danish defeats in wars such as the Thirty Years' War and Second Northern War.

Poland

Kresy ("Borderlands") are the eastern lands that formerly belonged to Poland and held a sizable amount of Polish population. In 1921, during the Polish-Soviet war, Polish troops crossed the Curzon Line that had been declared as the eastern polish border by an international commission, and in the Kiev Offensive (1920) conquered territories, now today inside the borders of Ukraine and Belarus, which were claimed to have been taken from Poland during the Partitions of Poland, and also seized 7 percent of Lithuania's territory. The new polish territories east of the Curzon line were taken back by the Soviet Union in 1939 under the Molotov–Ribbentrop Pact after the Soviet-German invasion of Poland, and include major cities, like Lviv (Lwów) (nowadays Ukraine), Vilnius (Wilno) (today the capital of Lithuania), and Hrodna (Grodno) (Belarus), which all had majority Polish population. Even though Kresy, or the Eastern Borderlands, are no longer Polish territories, the area is still inhabited by a significant Polish minority, and the memory of the Polish Kresy is still cultivated. The attachment to the "myth of Kresy", the vision of the region as a peaceful, idyllic, rural land, has been criticized in Polish discourse.

In January, February and March 2012, the Centre for Public Opinion Research conducted a survey, asking Poles about their ties to the Kresy. It turned out that almost 15% of the population of Poland (4.3–4.6 million people) declared that they had either been born in the Kresy, or had a parent or a grandparent who came from that region. Numerous treasures of Polish culture remain and there are numerous Kresy-oriented organizations. There are Polish sports clubs (Pogoń Lwów, and formerly FK Polonia Vilnius), newspapers (Gazeta Lwowska, Kurier Wileński), radio stations (in Lviv and Vilnius), numerous theatres, schools, choirs and folk ensembles. Poles living in Kresy are helped by Fundacja Pomoc Polakom na Wschodzie, a Polish government-sponsored organization, as well as other organizations, such as The Association of Help of Poles in the East Kresy (see also Karta Polaka). Money is frequently collected to help those Poles who live in the Kresy, and there are several annual events, such as a Christmas Package for a Polish Veteran in Kresy, and Summer with Poland, sponsored by the Association "Polish Community", in which Polish children from Kresy are invited to visit Poland. Polish language handbooks and films, as well as medicines and clothes are collected and sent to Kresy. Books are most often sent to Polish schools which exist there—for example, in December 2010, The University of Wrocław organized an event called Become a Polish Santa Claus and Give a Book to a Polish Child in Kresy. Polish churches and cemeteries (such as Cemetery of the Defenders of Lwów) are renovated with money from Poland.

Portugal

Portugal does not recognize Spanish sovereignty over the territory of Olivenza, ceded to Spain during the Napoleonic Wars.

Romania

Romanian nationalists lay claims to Greater Romania, but especially to Moldova, most of the territory which was part of the country between 1918 and 1940. Moldovan was the Soviet name for the Romanian language. There is some (but not universal) support by Moldovans for a peaceful and voluntary reunion with Romania, not least because (having joined the European Union), the economy has burgeoned and Romanian citizens have gained freedom of movement in Europe. Also, Russian irredentism over Transnistria has caused alarm and resentment.

Russia

The annexation of Crimea by the Russian Federation in 2014 was based on a claim of protecting ethnic Russians residing there. Crimea was part of the Russian Empire from 1783 to 1917, after which it enjoyed a few years of autonomy until it was made part of the Russian Soviet Federative Socialist Republic (which was a part of the Soviet Union) from 1921 to 1954 and then transferred to Soviet Ukraine (which also was a part of the Soviet Union) in 1954. After the dissolution of the Soviet Union, Crimea still remained part of Ukraine until February 2014. Russia declared Crimea to be part of the Russian Federation in March 2014, and effective administration commenced. The Russian regional status is not currently recognised by the UN General Assembly (Resolution 68/262) and by most countries.

Russian irredentism also includes southeastern and coastal Ukraine, known as Novorossiya, a term from the Russian Empire.

If the 12 July 2021 essay On the Historical Unity of Russians and Ukrainians, published by President Vladimir Putin, is to be considered an official Russian position, then its irredentist claims now extend to the entire territory of historical Ukraine and Belarus, including some areas now part of Romania.

Serbia

Serbian irredentism is manifested in Greater Serbia, the Serbian nationalist ideology. Greater Serbia consists of Serbia, North Macedonia, Bosnia and Herzegovina, Montenegro and large parts of Croatia. Used in the context of the Yugoslav wars, however, the Serbian struggle for Serbs to remain united in one country does not quite fit the term "irredentism". In the 19th century, Pan-Serbism sought to unite all of the Serb people across the Balkans, under Ottoman and Habsburg rule. Some intellectuals sought to unite all South Slavs (regardless of religion) into a Serbian state. Serbia had gained independence from the Ottoman Empire in 1878. Bosnia and Herzegovina, annexed by the Austrians in 1908, was viewed of as a part of the Serbian homeland. Serbia directed its territorial aspirations to the south, as the north and west was held by Austria. Macedonia was divided between Serbia, Bulgaria and Greece after the Balkan Wars.

In 1914, aspirations were directed towards Austria-Hungary. A government policy sought to incorporate all Serb-inhabited areas, and other South Slavic areas, thereby laying the foundation of Yugoslavia. With the establishment of the Kingdom of Serbs, Croats and Slovenes (later Yugoslavia), the Serbs now lived united in one country. During the breakup of Yugoslavia, the Serb political leadership in break-away Croatia and Bosnia and Herzegovina declared their territories to be part of the Federal Republic of Yugoslavia (Serbia and Montenegro).

The project of unification of Serb-inhabited areas in Croatia and Bosnia and Herzegovina during the Yugoslav Wars (see United Serb Republic) ultimately failed. The Croatian Operation Storm ended large-scale combat and captured most of the Republic of Serbian Krajina, while the Dayton Agreement ended the Bosnian War. Bosnia and Herzegovina was established as a federal republic, made up by two separate entities, one being Serb-inhabited Republika Srpska. There has since been calls by Bosnian Serb politicians for the secession of Republika Srpska, and possible unification with Serbia.

After the Kosovo War (1998–99), Kosovo became a UN protectorate, still de jure part of Serbia. The Albanian-majority Kosovo assembly unilaterally declared the independence of Kosovo in 2008, and its status since is disputed.

Sweden 

The Åland islands were disputed at one point, due to it having a population that overwhelmingly speaks Swedish.

North America

Mexico

In the Treaty of Guadalupe Hidalgo (1848) following the Mexican–American War (1845–48), Mexico ceded claims to what is now the Western and Southwestern United States to the United States (see Mexican Cession). The Cortina and Pizaña uprisings of 1859 and 1915 were influenced by irredentist ideas and the "proximity of the international boundary". The unsuccessful Pizaña uprising "was the last major armed protest on the part of Texas-Americans" (Tejanos). This 1915 uprising and the Plan of San Diego that preceded it marked the high point in Mexican irredentist sentiments.

In the early years of the Chicano Movement (El Movimiento) in the 1960s and 1970s, some movement figures "were political nationalists who advocated the secession of the Southwest from the Anglo republic of the United States of America, if not fully, at least locally with regard to Chicano self-determination in local governance, education and means of production". For example, in the 1970s, Reies Tijerina and his group La Alianza, espoused various separatist, secessionist, or irredentist beliefs. The Plan Espiritual de Aztlán, written during the First Chicano National Youth Conference in 1969, also stated "the fundamental Chicano nationalist goal of reclaiming Aztlán"—a reference to ancient Mexican myth—as "the rightful homeland of the Chicanos". However, "Most Chicano nationalists ... did not express the extreme desire for secession from the United States, and the nationalism they expressed weighed more heavily toward the broadly cultural than the explicitly political."

Today, there is virtually no Mexican American support for "separatist policies of self-determination". "Ethnonational irredentism by Mexicans in territories seized by the United States" following the Mexican–American War "declined after the failure of several attempted revolts at the end of the nineteenth century, in favor of internal ... struggles for immigrant and racial civil rights" in the United States. Neither the Mexican government nor any significant Mexican-American group "makes irredentist claims upon the United States". In the modern era, there "has been no evidence of irredentist sentiments among Mexican-Americans, even in such formerly Mexican territories as Southern California, ... nor of disloyalty to the United States, nor of active interest in the politics of Mexico".

Border disputes related to irredentist claims

Afghanistan 

The Afghan border with Pakistan, known as the Durand Line, was agreed to by Afghanistan and British India in 1893. The Pashtun tribes inhabiting the border areas were divided between what have become two nations; Afghanistan never accepted the still-porous border and clashes broke out in the 1950s and 1960s between Afghanistan and Pakistan over the issue. All Afghan governments of the past century have declared, with varying intensity, a long-term goal of re-uniting all Pashtun-dominated areas under Afghan rule. No other country in the world accepts Afghanistan's unilateral claim that the Durand Line is in dispute. Afghan claims over Pakistani territory have detrimentally affected Afghanistan–Pakistan relations.

Korea 

Since their founding, both Korean states have disputed the legitimacy of the other. The Constitution of North Korea stresses the importance of reunification, but, while it makes no similar formal provision for administering the South, it effectively claims its territory as it does not diplomatically recognise the Republic of Korea, deeming it an "entity occupying the Korean territory".

South Korea's constitution also claims jurisdiction over the entire Korean peninsula. It acknowledges the division of Korea only indirectly by requiring the president to work for reunification. The Committee for the Five Northern Korean Provinces, established in 1949, is the South Korean authority charged with the administration of Korean territory north of the Military Demarcation Line (i.e., North Korea), and consists of the governors of the five provinces, who are appointed by the President. However the body is purely symbolic and largely tasked with dealing with Northern defectors; if reunification were to occur the committee would be dissolved and new administrators appointed by the Ministry of Unification.

Pakistan 

Pakistan and India have from their independence sought to have the territory of Kashmir incorporated into them. Pakistan's and  India's dispute over the territory of Kashmir stems from events leading up to independence from the British.

See also
 Ethnic nationalism
 Ethnic cleansing
 Identity politics
 Lebensraum
 Revanchism
 Status quo ante bellum
 Manifest destiny
 Historical powers

References

Imperialism studies